The 1995 Big Sky Conference men's basketball tournament was the twentieth edition, held March 9–11 at the Dee Events Center at Weber State University in Ogden, Utah.

Top-seeded host Weber State easily defeated second seed  in the championship game, 84–62, to clinch their fifth Big Sky tournament title.

Format
Conference membership remained with the same eight teams, and no changes were made to the existing tournament format. The top six teams from the regular season participated, and the top two earned byes into the semifinals. The remaining four played in the quarterfinals, and the top seed met the lowest remaining seed in

Bracket

NCAA tournament
Weber State received the automatic bid to the NCAA tournament, and no other Big Sky members were invited.  Seeded fourteenth in the Southeast regional, the Wildcats met Michigan State
at Tallahassee, Florida. Down by nine at the half, the Wildcats outplayed the Spartans in the second half and won by seven points ; it was the first victory for a Big Sky team in the tournament in thirteen years, since Idaho made the Sweet Sixteen in 1982.  It was the last game for retiring Spartan head coach Jud Heathcote, who had previously coached in the Big Sky at Montana (1971–76). In the second round on Sunday, Weber State fell by two points at the buzzer to Georgetown and the Wildcats' season ended  they had last advanced in the NCAA tournament in 1979.

Runner-up Montana was invited to the NIT, but lost by thirty in the first round at Texas–El Paso.

See also
Big Sky Conference women's basketball tournament

References

Big Sky Conference men's basketball tournament
Tournament
Big Sky Conference men's basketball tournament
Big Sky Conference men's basketball tournament
Basketball competitions in Ogden, Utah
College sports tournaments in Utah